Mayer Andrés Candelo García (born 20 February 1977) is a Colombian football manager and former football player.

Career 
Candelo made his debut in 1996 for Deportivo Cali and played for Universitario de Deportes, whom he captained.

References

External links
 Profile

1977 births
Living people
Colombian footballers
Colombian expatriate footballers
Colombia international footballers
Deportivo Cali footballers
Club Atlético Vélez Sarsfield footballers
América de Cali footballers
Cortuluá footballers
Millonarios F.C. players
Deportes Tolima footballers
Universidad de Chile footballers
Club Universitario de Deportes footballers
Juan Aurich footballers
Club Deportivo Universidad César Vallejo footballers
Categoría Primera A players
Chilean Primera División players
Argentine Primera División players
Peruvian Primera División players
Expatriate footballers in Argentina
Expatriate footballers in Chile
Expatriate footballers in Peru
Colombian expatriate sportspeople in Argentina
Colombian expatriate sportspeople in Chile
Colombian expatriate sportspeople in Peru
2000 CONCACAF Gold Cup players
Association football midfielders
Footballers from Cali
Deportivo Cali managers